Jhon Janer Lucumí Bonilla (born 26 June 1998) is a Colombian professional footballer who plays as a defender for  club Bologna.

A youth product of hometown club Deportivo Cali, Lucumí made his professional football debut with the first team in 2015. After three years with the club, he transferred to Belgian Pro League side K.R.C. Genk, where he achieved a league title along with the Belgian Super Cup in his first season. In 2021, Lucumí won the Belgian Cup before moving to Serie A to play for Bologna the following year.

At youth level, Lucumí was part of the Colombia U-17 squad that won gold at the 2014 South American Games. Additionally, he represented his country at the 2015 South American U-17 Championship. In 2018, he received his first call-up to Colombia's senior team, however, his debut would come a year later in a friendly against Panama. That same year, he was included in manager Carlos Queiroz's final 23-man squad for the 2019 Copa América. He reappeared for the 2021 Copa América where Colombia secured a bronze medal.

Club career

Genk
Lucumí signed with Belgian club Genk in July 2018.

Bologna
On 18 August 2022, he moved to Italian club Bologna. He made his debut on 27 August, playing a full 90 minutes in a 2–0 home defeat to A.C. Milan. He made his first direct contribution for the club on 12 November, in a league match against Sassuolo, centering a cross to Michel Aebischer who provided Bologna's first goal of the match which ended in a 3–0 home win.

International career
He made his Colombia national team debut on 3 June 2019, in a friendly against Panama, as a starter.

Honours
Genk
Belgian First Division A: 2018–19
Belgian Cup: 2020–21

References

External links 
 

1997 births
Footballers from Cali
Living people
Colombian footballers
Association football defenders
Colombia youth international footballers
Colombia international footballers
Deportivo Cali footballers
K.R.C. Genk players
Bologna F.C. 1909 players
Categoría Primera A players
Belgian Pro League players
2019 Copa América players
2021 Copa América players
Colombian expatriate footballers
Expatriate footballers in Belgium
Colombian expatriate sportspeople in Belgium
Expatriate footballers in Italy
Colombian expatriate sportspeople in Italy